James L. Gaudino is an American retired academic administrator who served as the 14th President of Central Washington University in Ellensburg, Washington, from 2009 to 2021.

Education 
Gaudino earned a bachelor's degree from the United States Air Force Academy and served in California, Turkey, and Germany. He then earned a Master of Science degree in management from Troy University and a PhD in communications from Michigan State University.

Career 
Gaudino's research focuses on public relations and public opinion formation. Prior to joining Central Washington University, Gaudino founded the College of Communication and Information at Kent State University and worked on the faculty of the Michigan State University Department of Advertising. He served as executive director of the National Communication Association. Gaudino took office as president on January 1, 2009. In 2020, Gaudino announced that he would retire from his position in 2021. He retired on June 6, 2021, and was succeeded the following day by James Wohlpart.

References 

American academic administrators
Central Washington University
United States Air Force airmen
United States Air Force Academy alumni
Troy University alumni
Michigan State University alumni
Living people
Year of birth missing (living people)
Heads of universities and colleges in the United States